Isaac Stover House is a historic home located at Erwinna, Tinicum Township, Bucks County, Pennsylvania. It was built in the 1850s and remodeled in the 1870s. It is a two-story, six-bay, brick dwelling in the Second Empire style. It has a full width front porch.  It sits on a sandstone foundation and features a slate-covered mansard roof with dormers.

It was added to the National Register of Historic Places in 1990.

References

Houses on the National Register of Historic Places in Pennsylvania
Second Empire architecture in Pennsylvania
Houses in Bucks County, Pennsylvania
National Register of Historic Places in Bucks County, Pennsylvania
1850s establishments in Pennsylvania